Anatoliy Oleksiyovych (or Anatoli Alekseyevich) Shulzhenko (17 February 1945 – 8 July 1997) is a retired Ukrainian and Soviet football player.

Honours
 Soviet Top League winner: 1972.

International career
Shulzhenko played his only game for USSR on 28 April 1971 in a friendly against Bulgaria.

External links
  Profile at rusteam.permian.ru 
 
  short bio at football.lg.ua

1945 births
1997 deaths
Footballers from Luhansk
Soviet footballers
Soviet Union international footballers
Ukrainian footballers
FC Zorya Luhansk players
SC Tavriya Simferopol players
FC Zirka Kropyvnytskyi players
Soviet Top League players
Association football defenders